Wipo may refer to:

 The World Intellectual Property Organization (WIPO), one of the 15 specialized agencies of the United Nations.
 Wipo of Burgundy, a priest and writer.